Colonel Timothy Thomas Cyril Collins  (born 30 April 1960) is a retired Northern Irish military officer in the British Army. He is best known for his role in the Iraq War in 2003, and his eve-of-battle speech, a copy of which apparently hung in the White House's Oval Office. He is currently Chairman (and co-founder) of intelligence-based security services company Horus Global.

Early life
Collins was born and raised in Belfast, Northern Ireland, where he grew up during The Troubles. He was educated at the Royal Belfast Academical Institution before attending Queen's University of Belfast, where he gained a degree in economics.

Military career
After graduating from university, Collins was accepted into the Royal Military Academy Sandhurst, from where he was commissioned into the Royal Signals as a second lieutenant on a short service commission on 2 October 1981. He was promoted to lieutenant with seniority from 7 April 1982. He transferred to the Royal Irish Rangers on 18 October 1982. He switched to a full commission on 22 October 1984, and was promoted captain on 7 October 1985.

He passed selection into the SAS in 1988, going on to serve 2 operational tours with the Regiment and 1 tour at HQ Special Forces in York barracks London

He was promoted major on 30 September 1992, and lieutenant-colonel on 30 June 1999. Collins was appointed commanding officer of the 1st Battalion, Royal Irish Regiment in 2001. For a tour of duty in Northern Ireland between October 2001 and March 2002, he was awarded the Queen's Commendation for Valuable Service on 29 October 2002. It was in the capacity of 1 R Irish's commanding officer that he rose to prominence while serving in Iraq.

On 31 October 2003 he was appointed Officer of the Order of the British Empire, for his service in Iraq and was invested on 7 April 2004.  Collins was promoted to colonel and moved to the General Staff on 30 June 2003.

He set up the Peace Support College in Sarajevo before becoming DACOS Training at HQ Land Command until his retirement.

Eve-of-battle speech
As Lieutenant Colonel (Commanding Officer) of the 1st Battalion, Royal Irish Regiment of the British Army, Collins gave a rousing eve-of-battle speech to his troops in Kuwait on Wednesday 19 March 2003. The speech was extemporised, and was recorded in shorthand by a single journalist, Sarah Oliver. No recording or film of the speech exists, Collins told the BBC.

Speech excerpt

In popular culture
The "Mark of Cain" line from the speech inspired the title of the 2007 Film4 Productions drama The Mark of Cain. In the film a commanding officer makes a speech based on Collins' to his men.

The last episode of the 2008 television series 10 Days to War features a version of the speech performed by Kenneth Branagh as Collins.

Accusations of detainee mistreatment

In 2003, Collins was accused by Major Re Biastre of the US Army's 402nd Civil Affairs Battalion of mistreating Iraqi detainees. In Biastre's allegations, he stated that he had never seen any of the alleged mistreatment personally, but had instead overheard them being discussed by British and American military personnel. The Royal Military Police (RMP) opened an investigation into Biastre's claims, during which it found that Biastre had been verbally reprimanded by Collins and made to stand at attention for 45 minutes for distributing sweets to Iraqi children against explicit orders not to do so. The allegations were denounced by USMC Major Stan Coerr, who stated in an interview that "I didn’t see any of these incidents and I don’t for a second believe them. The fact is that this whole thing was started by an incompetent officer lashing out at someone who embarrassed him in front of his troops." Several Royal Irish Regiment soldiers who had served under Collins signed testimonies supporting his refutations of Biastre's allegations. In September 2003, the Ministry of Defence announced that the RMP investigation had concluded that Collins was innocent of all charges and would not be prosecuted. Collins subsequently sued the Sunday Mirror in the High Court of Northern Ireland for libel over their reporting of the allegations, winning a substantial amount of undisclosed damages from them. After Collins' court victory, his solicitor Ernie Telford stated that the allegations "have caused immense distress to my client, his wife and children."

Post-military career
He officially left the British Army on 5 August 2004.

Media appearances
Since leaving the Army, Collins' views on the Iraq conflict and other military issues have been widely sought. In 2007, Collins was host of a three-part documentary called "Ships That Changed the World" for BBC Northern Ireland. In December 2008 – during an interview on the BBC's Today programme, Collins said that, when he left in 2004, the British Army was already undermanned for existing commitments. In February 2011 Tim Collins appeared on the BBC news programme Panorama in a special entitled 'Forgotten Heroes'. In the documentary, Collins meets veterans struggling to cope with civilian life and sleeps rough on the streets of Brighton with another former soldier.

Politics
Collins has been approached by both the Conservative Party and the Ulster Unionist Party to run for Parliament, though has not made any commitment to either party. During the 2005 Ulster Unionist leadership election he was cited by a number of prominent Ulster Unionists as an outside figure who would make a good leader, but Collins declined as he felt he had "no experience of politics." Collins is a signatory of the founding statement of principles of the Henry Jackson Society, which advocates a pro-active approach to the spread of liberal democracy through the world. He has recently been critical of the Iraq war: "the UK and US pour blood and treasure into overseas campaigns which seem to have no ending and no goal ... Clearly I was naive".

In December 2011, it was revealed that Collins was approached to stand as an elected police commissioner for the Conservatives in Kent and originally was standing, however he later dropped out of the race. In August 2014, Collins was one of 200 public figures who were signatories to a letter to The Guardian opposing Scottish independence in the run-up to September's referendum on that issue.

Business career

Collins is the Chairman of specialist security company, Horus Global.

Works

References

External links 
 
 
 
 

1960 births
Living people
Royal Corps of Signals officers
Special Air Service officers
Royal Irish Rangers officers
Royal Irish Regiment (1992) officers
Military personnel from Belfast
Officers of the Order of the British Empire
Recipients of the Commendation for Valuable Service
Alumni of Queen's University Belfast
British Army personnel of the Iraq War
People educated at the Royal Belfast Academical Institution
Conservative Party (UK) politicians
British military personnel of The Troubles (Northern Ireland)